Kiviõli is an industrial town in Ida-Viru County, Estonia. The settlement was founded in 1922 and became a town in 1946. The main industry is oil shale mining, which gives the town its name (literally "stone oil").

In 2000, 51% of inhabitants were ethnic Russians and 39,4% were Estonians.

Neighborhoods of Kiviõli
Included in the town limits, but somewhat separate from the main part of the town, are the districts of Küttejõu and Varinurme.

There are five neighborhoods of Kiviõli:
Küttejõu
Lepatee
Sala-Aru
Soopealse
Varinurme.

Sport
Estonian Sidecarcross Grand Prix has taken place in Kiviõli annually since 2008.

Gallery

See also
Eesti Kiviõli
Eesti Küttejõud

References

External links

Cities and towns in Estonia
Former municipalities of Estonia
Populated places in Ida-Viru County
Populated places established in 1922
1922 establishments in Estonia
Lüganuse Parish